The Eastern Railway, formerly also known as the Vienna-Raab railway, is a two-track, electrified railway line that runs from Vienna towards Hungary. The name Eastern Railway refers to several branches of the line as well. The previous western terminus of the railway line in Vienna, Wien Südbahnhof, has been replaced by the new Hauptbahnhof, which allows for continuous east-west traffic and connects the Eastern Railway directly to the Western Railway and Southern Railway.

External links 
 
 Wien-Südbahnhof: Photogallery and documentation about the Vienna Southern Railway Station (Wien-Südbahnhof) by Martin Frey and Philipp Graf

Railway lines in Austria